Polypeptide N-acetylgalactosaminyltransferase 3 is an enzyme that in humans is encoded by the GALNT3 gene.

This gene encodes UDP-GalNAc transferase 3, a member of the polypeptide GalNAc transferase (GalNAc-T) family. This family transfers an N-acetyl galactosamine to the hydroxyl group of a serine or threonine residue in the first step of O-linked oligosaccharide biosynthesis. Individual GalNAc-transferases have distinct activities and initiation of O-glycosylation is regulated by a repertoire of GalNAc-transferases.  The protein encoded by this gene is highly homologous to other family members; however, the enzymes have different substrate specificities.

References

Further reading